BMJ Health & Care Informatics is a peer-reviewed open-access medical journal covering health informatics. It was established in 1992 and is published by the BMJ. The editor-in-chief is Yu-Chuan Jack Li. The journal was established in 1992 as Informatics in Primary Care, and was renamed to Journal of Innovation in Health Informatics in 2015, obtaining its current name in 2019.

It is an official publication of the British Computer Society  and has a partnership agreement with the Faculty of Clinical Informatics.

Abstracting and indexing
The journal is abstracted and indexed in: Index Medicus/MEDLINE/PubMed, Scopus, and EBSCOhost.

References

External links
  for BMJ Health & Care Informatics
 for Journal of Innovation in Health Informatics (previous title)

Creative Commons-licensed journals
English-language journals
Biomedical informatics journals
Quarterly journals
Publications established in 1992
British Computer Society